Billy Jay Lobjoit (born 3 September 1993 in Edgware, London) is an English professional footballer who plays for Bishop's Stortford.

Career

Leyton Orient
Lobjoit started his career in 2004 with a youth contract at Doncaster Rovers, and a scholarship contract from the 2005–06 season. For 2008–09, he moved to Leyton Orient and played in the U-18 team while aged 15. During 2010–11, scored 12 goals in 27 games, and was named as a first-team substitute in September 2011 when manager Russell Slade found his squad depleted with injuries. He made a total of seven appearances on the bench during the 2011–12 season.

In January 2012, Lobjoit signed for Boreham Wood on a work experience loan, and scored twice on his debut in a 3–0 win over Weston-super-Mare on 21 January.

On 30 April 2012, after scoring a total of 13 goals in 19 games for Orient's youth team in 2011–12, Lobjoit was given a year-long professional contract at Brisbane Road. He made his full Orient debut on 5 May as a substitute in the 2–1 home win against Rochdale, the last game of the season.

After being convicted of robbery, Lobjoit was released from his Leyton Orient contract on 4 March 2013.

Bishop's Stortford
On his release from Orient, Lobjoit signed for Bishop's Stortford, and made his debut as a substitute in the 3–1 defeat at home to Brackley Town in the Conference North on 30 March 2013. He scored his first goal for the club on 3 April, in the 2–1 home defeat to Gloucester City.

Hendon
Shortly afterwards in August 2013, Lobjoit signed for Isthmian League Premier side Hendon. He made his debut in the 3–2 defeat at Enfield Town, and made six appearances for the club before leaving in late September.

Boreham Wood
On 25 September 2013, it was revealed that Lobjoit had signed for Boreham Wood in the Conference South. He made his first appearance against Barton Rovers in the FA Cup Second Qualifying Round three days later; the game ended 0–0.

Gainsborough Trinity
In August 2014 Lobjoit penned a deal with Conference North side Gainsborough Trinity. He returned to Bishop's Stortford shortly before the start of the 2015–16 season, and has a dual registration with Brentwood Town.

Personal life
In March 2013, Lobjoit pleaded guilty to two charges of robbery after using his distinctive white Smart Car to drive a friend away from two armed hold-ups. He received an 18-month prison sentence suspended for two years, a two-year driving ban, and was ordered to pay £385 compensation. Lobjoit was also banned from licensed premises for six months on Friday and Saturday evenings.

References

External links 

1993 births
Living people
People from Edgware
Association football forwards
English footballers
Doncaster Rovers F.C. players
Leyton Orient F.C. players
Boreham Wood F.C. players
Bishop's Stortford F.C. players
Hendon F.C. players
Billericay Town F.C. players
Gainsborough Trinity F.C. players
Leighton Town F.C. players
Brentwood Town F.C. players
English Football League players
National League (English football) players
Isthmian League players
Southern Football League players